The FCW Jack Brisco 15 Championship was a professional wrestling championship contested in 15-minute Iron Man matches by Florida Championship Wrestling. A medal was held by the title holder, rather than a championship belt that is primarily used in professional wrestling.

History
Seth Rollins and Hunico previously fought in the first 'FCW 15' match, an iron man match which lasted 15 minutes. Following the match, FCW's General Manager Maxine declared the FCW 15 Jack Brisco Classic Tournament, which included Rollins and Hunico in addition to Richie Steamboat and Jinder Mahal. In the tournament final, Rollins defeated Hunico to become the inaugural champion. The final match was later released on a best of Seth Rollins DVD put out by WWE in 2017.

Reigns

References

Jack Brisco 15 Championship